James Joseph "Jim" Tomkovicz (born October 10, 1951 in Los Angeles, California) is an American educator and legal scholar. He is a professor of law at the University of Iowa College of Law.  Tomkovicz has authored six amicus curiae briefs in the Supreme Court of the United States; most recently, he was on the winning side of a 5–4 decision in Arizona v. Gant.

Books 

Tomkovicz is the author of the criminal procedure casebook Criminal Procedure: Constitutional Constraints Upon Investigation and Proof (LexisNexis 2012), now in its seventh edition. He also authored The Right to the Assistance of Counsel: A Reference Guide to the United States Constitution and Criminal Procedure (Greenwood Press). Tomkovicz's most recent book project, entitled "Constitutional Exclusion: The Rules, Rights, and Remedies that Strike the Balance Between Freedom and Order," was published by Oxford University Press in the Spring of 2010.  The text describes and analyzes the seven distinct constitutional bases for excluding potentially probative evidence of guilty from criminal proceedings.

Scholarly works 

In Tomkovicz's recent law review article, Hudson v. Michigan and the Future of Fourth Amendment Exclusion, he lays out a roadmap for the future of the exclusionary rule. He has been published by law reviews at California-Davis, Hastings, Illinois, Iowa, Michigan, Mississippi, North Carolina, Ohio State, Washington & Lee, William & Mary, and Yale.

Criminal code reorganization 

Tomkovicz was appointed to the "Iowa Criminal Code Reorganization Committee," a group charged by the Iowa legislature with studying and formulating revision of the Iowa Criminal Code.  That legislative project, however, was put on hold by the Iowa legislature and is unlikely to move forward in the foreseeable future.

Employment 

Tomkovicz joined the Iowa faculty in 1982 after serving as a visiting professor at Iowa in the spring of 1981 and an adjunct professor at the UCLA School of Law during the 1981-82 academic year. Prior to that, Tomkovicz was an attorney with the Appellate Section of the Lands Division of the Department of Justice in Washington, D.C. He also served as a law clerk to Hon. Edward J. Schwartz, Chief Judge of the U.S. District Court for the Southern District of California, and as law clerk to Hon. John M. Ferren, Associate Judge of the District of Columbia Court of Appeals.  Tomkovicz has been a visiting professor at the UCLA School of Law on four occasions (2003, 2008, 2011, and 2013), and has also taught at the University of Michigan Law School (1992), the University of Southern California School of Law (2011), the Emory University School of Law (2019), the University of San Diego School of Law (2004, 2006), and in the London Law Consortium (2002).

Education 

Tomkovicz received his Juris Doctor in 1976 from the UCLA School of Law, graduating 5th in a class of 295. His academic honors included Order of the Coif and membership in the UCLA Law Review from 1974-1976. Tomkovicz received his Bachelor of Arts in 1973 from the University of Southern California graduating Summa Cum Laude in Psychology.

Listing of works 

Tomkovicz has authored amicus curiae briefs in Knowles v. Iowa, Florida v. J.L., Kyllo v. United States, United States v. Patane, Maryland v. Blake, and Arizona v. Gant.

References

American legal scholars
People from Los Angeles
UCLA School of Law alumni
UCLA School of Law faculty
University of Iowa College of Law faculty
University of Southern California alumni
Living people
1951 births